The Popular Socialist Party (PPS) was a communist party in Mexico. It was founded in 1948 as the Popular Party (Partido Popular) by Vicente Lombardo Toledano.

Lombardo Toledano, the initial leader of the Confederation of Mexican Workers (CTM), decided to launch a new party in response to the increasingly moderate and corrupt policies of the ruling Institutional Revolutionary Party (PRI). The Popular Party was supported by the mine, oil and rail workers' unions, but its potential strength in elections was reduced by the strength of the PRI.

The party adopted Marxism-Leninism as its ideological line in 1960.

It was renamed the Popular Socialist Party in 1960, and over time its leadership became less critical of the PRI. In subsequent years it was often criticized as being a "loyal opposition," or part of the status quo. This led to a split by the PPS's left wing in the 1970s that formed the Party of the Mexican People (PPM), which merged with the Mexican Communist Party to form the Unified Socialist Party of Mexico (PSUM).

In 1997, a second party with nearly the same name—the Popular Socialist Party of Mexico or PPSM—split off from the older PPS. This splinter group claims to be the true descendant of Lombardo Toledano's party.

The PPS's traditional political space (i.e. to the left of the PRI) has largely been captured by the Party of the Democratic Revolution (PRD) since 1989. The PPS lost its registration as a national political party in 1997, though it is currently registered as a national political association under the name Popular Socialista.

PPS presidents 
 Vicente Lombardo Toledano (1948–1968)
 Jorge Cruickshank García (1968–1989)
 Indalecio Sáyago Herrera (1989–1997)
 Manuel Fernández Flores (since 1997)

PPS candidates 
 Vicente Lombardo Toledano (1952)
 Adolfo López Mateos (allied with PRI and PARM; 1958)
 Gustavo Díaz Ordaz (allied with PRI and PARM; 1964)
 Luis Echeverría Álvarez (allied with PRI and PARM; 1970)
 José López Portillo (allied with PRI and PARM; 1976)
 Miguel de la Madrid (allied with PRI and PARM; 1982)
 Cuauhtémoc Cárdenas Solórzano (allied with PARM, PFCRN, and PMS to form National Democratic Front; 1988)
 Marcela Lombardo Otero (1994)

References 

1948 establishments in Mexico
Communist parties in Mexico
Far-left politics in Mexico
Institutional Revolutionary Party breakaway groups
National Political Associations in Mexico
Political parties established in 1948
Political parties in Mexico
International Meeting of Communist and Workers Parties